Ari Pulkkinen (born 15 January 1982) is a Finnish video game composer, musician and sound designer. His Angry Birds theme is perhaps his most famous work.

Biography 
Pulkkinen was born in Helsinki. At the age of 6 he started studying piano and composed his first song at the age of 12. He was interested in the computer music demoscene and started making music with tracker software under the name "ArtZ". He won many music competitions and made his first big public album to accompany a freeware game named "Starfight VI: Gatekeepers" in 1999. Ari has never studied music composition academically.

In 2003 he was hired as in-house audio director to game development company Frozenbyte Inc. Where he made the original soundtracks and sound design for video games Shadowgrounds, Shadowgrounds: Survivor and Trine. In his spare time Ari earned diplomas in Professional Audio Design and Producing and Further Education for Producers and Leads of the Finnish Game Industry with Adulta, and Music Technology with Sibelius Academy. After quitting Frozenbyte in 2008 (though he continues to have a professional relationship with them), Ari started his own sound production company AriTunes. Since then he has made original soundtrack and sound design for over twenty projects, including video games such as Angry Birds, Dead Nation, Trine 2, Outland and Super Stardust HD. Ari releases his music through his own label AriTunes.

On 2 September 2011 in Video Game Heroes Concert, Angry Birds Theme was played by London Philharmonic Orchestra. This is the first time Ari's music was played by a full live orchestra.

On 4 October 2011, Ari won the Best Finnish Game Developer in 2011 Award due to his contribution in the Finnish game industry.

Works 
 Starfight VI: Gatekeepers (2000)
 Shadowgrounds (2005)
 Super Stardust HD (2007)
 Shadowgrounds: Survivor (2007)
 Trine (2009)
 Angry Birds (2009)
 Angry Birds Seasons (2010)
 Dead Nation (2010)
 Outland (video game) (2011)
 Bike Baron (2011)
 Trine 2 (2011)
 Super Stardust Delta (2012)
 Trine 2: Goblin Menace (2012)
 Angry Birds Trilogy (2012)
 Resogun (2013)
 Trine 3: The Artifacts of Power (2015)
 Just Dance 2016 (2015)
 Alienation (2016)
 Nex Machina (2017)
 Nine Parchments (2017)
 Trine 4: The Nightmare Prince (2019)

Noteworthy competition entries 
 Assembly 2009 Music Compo – Rtzon King – Sovietski Electro (2nd place)
 Assembly 2004 Fast Music Compo – Summer Rain (1st place)
 Assembly 2003 Fast Music Compo – Back To the Roots (1st place)
 Assembly 2002 Fast Music Compo – Karjalan Haamu (2nd place)
 Assembly 2001 Fast Music Compo – Comrades (1st place)

External links 
 
 
Soundworks Interview about the audio & music of Angry Birds

1982 births
Demosceners
Finnish composers
Finnish male composers
Living people
Video game composers
Sound designers